Ille-sur-Têt (Catalan: Illa or Illa de Tet) is a commune in the Pyrénées-Orientales département in southern France.

Its inhabitants are called Illois.

Geography
The commune is situated in the Ribéral region along the route nationale 116 and is crossed by the river Têt (in the north), as well as by its tributary, the Boulès (in the south). It is one of the gateways to the Fenouillèdes region (towards Montalba-le-Château or Bélesta).

Ille-sur-Têt is located in the canton of La Vallée de la Têt and in the arrondissement of Prades.

Population

Sites of interest 
 The 17th century Saint-Étienne Church
 The 12th century Sainte-Marie de la Rodona Church
 The 17th century Hospice Saint-Jacques d'Ille-sur-Tet (Hospici d'Illa in Catalan)
 The geological site of the Orgues d'Ille-sur-Têt, 10–12 m tall hoodoos

Notable people 
 Jean Bardou (1799-1852), industrialist, born in Ille-sur-Têt.
 Charles Dupuy (1851-1923), died in Ille-sur-Têt in 1923, President of the Council of Ministers under Presidents Sadi Carnot, Jean Casimir-Perier, Félix Faure and Émile Loubet.
 Joseph-Sébastien Pons (1886-1962), poet, born and dead in Ille-sur-Têt.
 Xavier de Gaulle (1887-1955), civil engineer (mines), Second World War résistant. Arrested but released as a veteran, the Vichy regime sent him to Ille-sur-Têt as a tax inspector but he remained under police surveillance. He fled to Switzerland where in 1944 he was made Consul Général de France, a post he held until 1953.
 Pierre Fouché (1891-1967), died in Ille-sur-Têt, linguist.
 Jean Galia (1905-1949), born in Ille-sur-Têt, rugby union and rugby league player.
 Louis Amade (1915–1992), born in Ille-sur-Têt, writer, songwriter for Gilbert Bécaud and Édith Piaf among others.
 Paul Blanc (1937-), former Senator for Pyrénées-Orientales and mayor of Sournia, born in Ille-sur-Têt.
 Paul Loridant (1948-), born in Ille-sur-Têt, Senator for Essonne .

In fiction
Prosper Mérimée's short story La Vénus d'Ille takes place in Ille-sur-Têt.

See also
Communes of the Pyrénées-Orientales department

References

External links

  Official site of the town

Communes of Pyrénées-Orientales